Golenevo is a rural locality (a village) in Podlesnoye Rural Settlement, Vologodsky District, Vologda Oblast, Russia. The population was 8 as of 2002. There are 2 streets.

Geography 
Golenevo is located 17 km south of Vologda (the district's administrative centre) by road. Loptunovo is the nearest rural locality.

References 

Rural localities in Vologodsky District